Atlur is a village in Kadapa district of the Indian state of Andhra Pradesh. It is located in Atlur mandal of Badvel revenue division.

References 

Villages in Kadapa district